Peel Sessions is the name of two Extended Plays and a subsequent compilation released by the English musical group New Order.

Overview
Peel Sessions (later re-released as The John Peel Sessions in 2000) was the 1990 album release of the sessions New Order recorded in January 1981 and June 1982 for Radio 1's John Peel Show. Each session had previously been released as four-track EPs in 1986 (The Peel Sessions 1982) and 1987 (The Peel Sessions 1981).

"Truth", "Senses", "I.C.B." and "Dreams Never End" (recorded 26 January 1981) would be later recorded with Martin Hannett and released on Movement. The production and arrangements differ notably from those on the album. New Order would later dismiss Movement due to Hannett's style. In common with the album, the lead vocals on "Dreams Never End" were by bassist Peter Hook.

The 1982 session caught the band still in search of a new musical direction. "We All Stand" and "5-8-6" appeared on the subsequent album Power, Corruption & Lies. The songs "Too Late" and "Turn the Heater On", the latter a Keith Hudson reggae cover, were only ever recorded for the Peel session, and neither was performed live. "Turn the Heater On" was known to be one of Ian Curtis's favourite songs‚ and it is for this reason that New Order recorded their version as a tribute to him. Ian's admiration of reggae artists such as Keith Hudson and Toots and the Maytals is also mentioned by his wife Deborah Curtis in her book Touching From a Distance.  These tracks were broadcast on 1 June 1982 though were presumably recorded in spring 1982.

New Order went on to record a third John Peel Session in November 1998, and a further session for BBC radio with the Evening Session in October 2001. These later sessions were collected together and released in 2004 by Strange Fruit records as In Session.

Track listing
 All tracks written by New Order, except where noted.

Chart positions

The Peel Sessions 1982 (EP)

The Peel Sessions 1981 (EP)

References

New Order (band) live albums
New Order
1990 live albums
Strange Fruit Records live albums
New Order (band) EPs
1986 EPs
1987 EPs
1987 live albums
1986 live albums
Live EPs
Strange Fruit Records EPs